Caruncle (from Latin: caruncula, 'wart') may refer to:

 Caruncle (bird anatomy), a small, fleshy excrescence that is a normal part of an animal's anatomy
 Caruncle, an elaiosome (fleshy structure attached to the seed), especially in the plant family Euphorbiaceae
 Caruncle, an appendage to the prostomium of a worm's body
 Sublingual caruncle, an area on the human tongue
 Lacrimal caruncle, the nodule at the inner corner of the human eye
 Urethral caruncle, a benign outgrowth of the urethra